Otto Fleischmann (January 24, 1896 in Mór, Hungary; January 8, 1963 in New York City) was a Hungarian-born Freudian psychoanalyst.

Vienna 
Otto Fleischmann, although originally a juris doctor, studied philosophy with Moritz Schlick at the University of Vienna and in 1938, became a psychoanalyst under the mentorship of August Aichhorn. Fleischmann was associated with many psychoanalysts including Anna Freud. In 1946, he returned to Vienna from Budapest, to help Aichhorn revive the Vienna Psychoanalytic Society (WPV in German), which had been repressed under Nazi rule. He served as Secretary and Vice President of the WPV until his emigration to the United States to join the faculty of the Menninger Clinic in Topeka, Kansas.

Budapest 1938–1946 
After the Anschluss, the German Nazi takeover of Austria, Fleischmann went to Budapest, Hungary. In 1944, with the German occupation of Hungary, he received diplomatic protection from the Swedish Foreign Ministry through a Schutzpass provided by Raoul Wallenberg. Fleischmann subsequently worked with Raoul Wallenberg in his efforts to save Jews in Hungary, 1944–1945.

Swedish embassy in Budapest 
Between 1944 and 1945 Karoly Szabo was one of the typewriter mechanics of the Swedish embassy. Dr. Otto Fleischmann motivated Karoly Szabo to play an active role in the rescue actions of Raoul Wallenberg. Pál Szalai supported his friend Karoly Szabo with important personal documents, signed by the German command in the Battle of Budapest. Otto Fleischmann prepared Karoly Szabo psychologically for the rescue actions, and the intuitive decision to purchase a leather coat was another key factor. The black leather trench coat, was a means of inspiring fear and respect, and the subsequent Hollywood image of the black-clad, trench-coated Gestapo officer has entered popular culture. In Budapest's Jewish community Szabó was known as "the mysterious man in the leather coat".

Károly Szabó saved Fleischmann's life in December 1944 (witness in Fleischmann papers, Library of Congress).

Karoly Szabo was honored as Righteous among the Nations on November 12, 2012.
Pál Szalai was honored as Righteous among the Nations 04.7.2009.

Raoul Wallenberg 
Fleischmann worked with Wallenberg in attempts to protect members of the Hungarian Psychoanalytical community. The last meeting between Raoul Wallenberg and Pal Szalai, together with Fleischmann and Károly Szabó, was on the evening of January 12, 1945 at the Gyopár street Swedish Embassy at Wallenberg's "last supper" invitation. The next day — on January 13 — Wallenberg contacted the Russians to secure food and supplies for the people under his protection. He was detained by the Soviet forces on January 17, 1945.

Menninger Foundation in the United States 
In 1949, Fleischmann joined the Menninger Clinic in Topeka, Kansas. On 25 May 1956, Dr. Fleischmann was re-elected to serve as Director of the Institute for the year 1956–57. Dr. Fleischmann, head of the psychoanalytic institute was doing psychotherapy behind a one-way vision screen, in full view of all the students. The Clinic became the center of choice for Hollywood stars. Among these were: Judy Garland and Marilyn Monroe.

While at the Menninger Clinic, Fleischmann met and married Dr. Gisela Ebert, a psychiatric resident. Their two children, Esther Fleischmann (b. 1952) and David Fleischmann (b. 1956, deceased) were born in Topeka.

References

External links 
 Otto Fleischmann papers, 1910-1985
 Otto Fleischmann papers, Library of Congress has been dedicated to the public (PDF; 23 kB)
 Otto and Gisela Fleischmann Collection at the Historical Medical Library at the College of Physicians of Philadelphia. Donated by Esther Fleischmann

Hungarian emigrants to the United States
Jewish Hungarian history
History of Budapest
1896 births
1963 deaths
Raoul Wallenberg
American psychoanalysts